Said Zaman Khan v. Federation of Pakistan is a landmark decision in which the Supreme Court of Pakistan  upheld death sentences against sixteen terrorists convicted by military courts in 2016. The accused included members of militant groups Tehreek-i-Taliban Pakistan  and al-Qaeda, as well as suspects involved in the Peshawar school massacre in 2014, the Bannu jailbreak in 2012, and the Rawalpindi Parade Lane bombing in 2009. The decision marked the first time the Court ruled on the legality of military trials, legalized for civilian terror suspects after the school massacre.

Background
In the aftermath of the Peshawar school massacre on 16 December 2014, the government of Prime Minister Nawaz Sharif responded by lifting its moratorium on the death penalty  and authorizing military courts to try civilians charged with terrorism, through the Twenty-first Amendment to the Constitution of Pakistan. Persons accused of terrorism were tried by field general court martial (FGCM). In the event of conviction, their death warrants were signed by Chief of Army Staff General Raheel Sharif throughout 2015 and 2016.

Involvement in acts of terrorism
The terror suspects included members of militant groups Tehreek-i-Taliban Pakistan  and al-Qaeda, and were convicted for involvement in:
Peshawar school massacre, 16 December 2014
Bannu jailbreak, 25 April 2012
Rawalpindi Parade Lane bombing, 4 December 2009
Naushera mosque attack, 12 June 2009
Attacks on law enforcement agencies

Before the Supreme Court of Pakistan
Relatives of the convicts filed petitions before the Supreme Court of Pakistan, alleging mala fide. They were represented by human rights lawyer Asma Jahangir and senior lawyer Ahmad Raza Khan Kasuri. The prosecution team was led by Attorney-General for Pakistan Ashtar Ausaf Ali.

Opinion
A five-judge bench consisting of Chief Justice Anwar Zaheer Jamali, Amir Hani Muslim, Sh. Azmat Saeed, Manzoor Ahmad Malik, and Faizal Arab upheld the death sentences, observing that the petitioners could not prove that the trials by the FGCM were mala fide with a collateral purpose.

References

Supreme Court of Pakistan cases
2014 Peshawar school massacre